Lucy Robinson may refer to:

Television
Lucy Robinson (actress) (born 1966), British actress
Lucy Robinson (Neighbours), a character from the Australian soap opera Neighbours
Lucy Robinson, British television producer of sitcom Pramface

Others
Lucy Robinson (historian), British academic
Lucy Robinson (wheelchair basketball) (born 1999), British wheelchair basketball player